Mattia Nalesso (born 13 February 1981) is an Italian butterfly swimmer who competed in both the 2004 Summer Olympics and the 2008 Summer Olympics.

References

1981 births
Living people
Italian male butterfly swimmers
Olympic swimmers of Italy
Swimmers at the 2004 Summer Olympics
Swimmers at the 2008 Summer Olympics
Mediterranean Games gold medalists for Italy
Mediterranean Games medalists in swimming
Swimmers at the 2001 Mediterranean Games
Swimmers of Centro Sportivo Carabinieri
20th-century Italian people
21st-century Italian people